Her Husband's Faith is a 1916 American silent short film directed by Lloyd B. Carleton. The film is based on a story by Paul Machette. Eugene De Rue developed the screenplay. This domestic society drama's features Dorothy Davenport, T. D. Crittenden and Emory Johnson.

The story revolves around Richard and Mabel Otto. They are happily married and have a three-year-old son. The couple holds a reception at their home when a drifter shows up at the front door. Suddenly, things start to unravel when the stranger reveals secrets about Mabel's shadowy past. The couple's survival will depend on Richard's faith in his wife.

The film was released on May 11, 1916, by Universal.



Plot
Richard Otto and his wife, Mabel, have a joyful marriage and live in a spacious home. They have a three-year-old boy whom both parents adore. One day, Mabel says to her husband: "Five blissful years of marriage, a beautiful home, a tender husband, and a darling baby — surely God has been good to me." Richard and Mabel Otto decide to throw a big reception to celebrate their good fortune. The couple sends invitations and places an announcement in the local newspaper.

The scene shifts to a local park where a drifter named Tom Willis sits on a park bench. While reading the local newspaper, he notices the article announcing Otto's reception. The item contains a picture of Mable Otto, and he recognizes her as someone from his murky past. He believes Mabel was his former partner in crime when they traveled in the criminal underworld. At some point, she left him, and Willis never saw her again. Seeing Mabel's picture stirs up old emotions, and he wants to reconnect.

Mr. and Mrs. Otto's reception is in full swing. Several guests are doting on the young boy when his bedtime arrives. Mabel takes the boy to his bedroom and puts him to sleep. When she returns to the party, she tells Richard all the tricks the little one had learned. However, the young boy still can't sleep and rings the bell for his mother. Both parents dutifully leave their guests and try to put the boy to sleep. A domestic enters the bedroom and informs Richard a caller was waiting at the front door. He leaves to greet his guest.

Richard opens the front door and immediately recognizes Tom Willis. Willis was a man whom Otto had once helped with a small loan. Willis tells Otto he is down on his luck again and needs another loan. Richard invites Tom into the house. After they are comfortable, Willis tells Richard a story about his past relationship with a woman in the criminal underground. After describing how deeply in love he was, he states he would do anything to win her back. Richard seems to sympathize with Tom's story of lost love. Willis then tells Otto the love story's mystery woman is Mabel Otto. Richard reels in shock and tells Tom—they have a healthy marriage, share a son, and have a wonderful life. Then Otto emphatically tells Willis he should never come to their house again or ever attempt to meet his wife.

Willis had checked out the house and its contents during their previous conversation. He leaves Otto's home but returns later to steal valuable jewelry. During the attempted burglary, Mable and her son stumble upon the attempted theft. Mable sees Tom and remembers him from her past. Hearing the commotion, Richard rushes to the room. The tension rises, but when Willis sees them all together, he takes one last glance at Mabel and flees without saying a word.

Richard tells Mable the man had asked for money and then concocted some cock-and-bull story about her being an underworld member. He also mentioned Willis believed Mable was part of that past underworld connection. Richard states he never accepted the Willis story and completely believed in his wife's version of her past. Her husband's faith in his wife's version of her past prevailed.

Cast
{| 
! style="width: 180px; text-align: left;" |  Actor
! style="width: 230px; text-align: left;" |  Role
|- style="text-align: left;"
|Dorothy Davenport||Mabel Otto
|-
|Emory Johnson||Richard Otto
|-
|Trookwood D. Crittenden||Tom Willis
|-
|Frankie Lee||Otto's 3-year-old son
|-
|}

Production

Pre production

Development
According to the book - The Universal Story, Carl Laemmle (-1939) produced around 91 feature movies in 1916.
Lloyd B. Carleton (–1933) started working for Carl Laemmle in the Fall of 1915. Carleton arrived with impeccable credentials, having directed some 60 films for the likes of Thanhouser, Lubin, Fox, and Selig. 
Between March and December 1916, 44-year-old Lloyd Carleton directed 16 movies for Universal, starting with The Yaqui and ending with The Morals of Hilda. Emory Johnson acted in all 16 of these films. Of Carleton's total 1916 output, 11 were feature films, and the rest were two-reel shorts. 
In 1916, Carleton directed 13 films pairing Dorothy Davenport and Emory Johnson. This film would be the second in the 13-film series. These totals show Carl Laemmle gave Davenport-Johnson pairing one of his elite directors from the working cadre of universal directors to produce the screen chemistry Laemmle was seeking.

Casting
Dorothy Davenport (1895–1977) was an established star for Universal when the  year-old actress played Mabel Otto. She had acted in hundreds of movies by the time she starred in this film. Most of these films were 2-reel shorts, as was the norm in Hollywood's teen years. She had been making movies since 1910. She started dating Wally Reid when she was barely 16, and he was 20. They married in 1913. After her husband died in 1923, she used the name "Mrs. Wallace Reid" in the credits for any project she took part in. Besides being an actress, she would eventually become a film director, producer, and writer.
Emory Johnson (1894–1960) was  years old when he acted in this movie as Richard Otto. In January 1916, Emory signed a contract with Universal Film Manufacturing Company. Carl Laemmle of Universal Film Manufacturing Company thought he saw great potential in Johnson, so he chose him to be Universal's new leading man. Laemmle's hope was Johnson would become another Wallace Reed. A major part of his plan was to create a movie couple that would sizzle on the silver screen. Laemmle thought Dorothy Davenport and Emory Johnson could create the chemistry he sought. Johnson and Davenport would complete 13 films together. They started with the successful feature production of Doctor Neighbor in May 1916 and ended with The Devil's Bondwoman in November 1916. After completing the last movie, Laemmle thought Johnson did not have the screen presence he wanted. He decided not to renew his contract. Johnson would make 17 movies in 1916, including 6 shorts and 11 feature-length Dramas. 1916 would become the second-highest movie output of his entire acting career. Emory acted in  25 films for Universal, mostly dramas with a sprinkling of comedies and westerns. 
Frankie Lee (1911–1970) had made his acting debut in the 1916 Universal production of Her Greatest Story.  Lee was  years old when he appeared in this film. This release would be his second film performance and his acting debut with Emory Johnson. Both actors would unite again at the end of 1916 in the Universal production of The Right to Be Happy. Lee would also appear in the 1922 Emory Johnson-directed picture The Third Alarm. Frankie was also the older brother of Davey Lee, another child actor. Frankie made his last film appearance in the 1925 production of The Golden Strain which starred Hobart Bosworth and Madge Bellamy. He appeared in 56 films between 1916 and 1925. 
T. D. Crittenden (1878–1938) was  years-old when he played the heavy, Tom Willis. He appeared in 69 films between 1912 and 1924, and he made 22 movies in 1916, of which 5 were features.

Screenplay
Eugene De Rue (1885–1985) developed the screenplay based on a story by Paul Machette (1874–1927). Both writers were actors and directors.

Filming
There is no published record of when filming began. An item published in the Motion Picture News on April 22, 1916, stated: 
"The Lloyd B. Carleton Company has just completed the filming of "Her Husband's Faith." 
This announcement is consistent with the film's release on May 11, 1916.

The movie was produced in the studio complex at Universal Studios located at 100 Universal City Plaza in  Universal City, California.

Alternate title
Similar films are described under different titles using a cast, length, plot, producer, release date, and "Her Husband's Faith" title as a reference point.

In the June 1915 issue of Kalem Kalendar, a brief review of "Her Husband's Honor" was released by Kalem on June 7, 1915. The short film stars Henry Pemberton and Elsie McLeod. The plot involves a women's desire for adventure leads to the smuggling of diamonds. The same listing can be seen on the IMDb database. There is no listing of any copyright filed for this film.

In the May 13, 1916, issue of Motography listed under "Universal Programs," there is a brief review of "Her Husband's Honor." The cast, length, plot, producer, and release date are correct when measured against our reference film, except the title is incorrect. The same issue of Motography also lists under the heading "Complete Record of Current Films," a correct film Length, Producer, Release Date, and Title. No Cast or plot is shown.

In the May 13, 1916, issue of Moving Picture World, there is an identical listing to the Motography review, i.e., the cast, length, plot, producer, and release date are correct when measured against the reference film, except for the incorrect title of "Her Husband's Honor.".

In the May 20, 1916 issue of Motography, under "Universal Programs," there is an amended listing of "Her Husband's Honor." This review shows a short film featuring Ben Wilson and Dorothy Phillips with a release date of May 18, 1916. This Rex produced film has a plot of a lawyer's wife attempting to sell valuable documents. There is no listing of any copyright filed for this film.

However, we see a new listing of "A Wife at Bay." This short film stars Ben Wilson and Dorothy Phillips with a release date of May 20, 1916, by Rex Motion Picture Company (Note: Rex is one of the companies that merged with Universal in 1912). The plot involves a lawyer's wife attempting to sell valuable documents. This film has a listing on the IMDb and a copyright This film is identical to the Motography listing of "Her Husband's Honor."

Lastly, Her Husband's Honor was a feature film released by Mutual Film on August 5, 1918, and involved a frivolous socialite entangled in shady business dealings.  It starred David Powell and Edna Goodrich. There is a IMDb listing. and a copyright was filed.

Release and reception

Official release
The film was copyrighted on May 3, 1916 and officially released on May 11, 1916.

Advertising
By 1915, feature films were becoming more the trend in Hollywood. However, Universal wasn't ready to downsize its short film business. Short films were cheaper and faster to produce than feature films. While advertising short films, Universal might include a section titled–"' The Universal Programs'" above the movie ads, espousing the advantages of continuing to show short films.

In 1916, short films were shown in conjunction with other short films to create a "diversified program" and were typically advertised only with a short synopsis. A newspaper ad shows Her Husband's Faith playing along with two short comedies:

Reviews

Critical Response
In the May 13, 1916 issue of the Motion Picture News, a reviewer opines:

In the June 3, 1916, issue of The Wilmington Morning Star, an article reads:

In the June 13, 1916, issue of The Tampa Tribune, an article says:

Preservation status
According to the Library of Congress, all known copies of this film are lost.

Gallery

Notes

References

External links

 

Katchmer, George A. A Biographical Dictionary of Silent Film Western Actors and Actresses, McFarland, 2002, p. 204.
Holmstrom, John. The Moving Picture Boy: An International Encyclopaedia from 1895 to 1995, Norwich, Michael Russell, 1996.
List of Universal Pictures films (1912–1919)
Universal Pictures
List of American films of 1916

1916 lost films
1916 drama films
1916 films
American black-and-white films
American silent short films
Lost American films
Universal Pictures short films
Films directed by Lloyd B. Carleton
1910s English-language films
1910s American films